The 2022 Mosconi Cup was the 29th edition of an annual nine-ball pool tournament between teams representing Europe and the United States. It took place between 30 November and 3 December 2022 at Bally's Las Vegas in Las Vegas, Nevada, the first time since 2019 that the tournament was staged in the United States. It was broadcast live on Sky Sports in the UK and on networks worldwide.

Going into the event, Team Europe were two-time defending champions, having won their second consecutive tournament in 2021 by a scoreline of 11–6.

Teams

Results

Wednesday, 30 November

Thursday, 1 December

Friday, 2 December

Saturday, 3 December

Notes

References

External links 
 Official homepage

2022
International sports competitions hosted by the United States
Sports competitions in the Las Vegas Valley
Mosconi Cup
Mosconi Cup
Mosconi Cup
Mosconi Cup